WHBK is a Southern Gospel formatted broadcast radio station licensed to Marshall, North Carolina, serving Madison County, North Carolina and Northern Buncombe County, North Carolina.  WHBK is owned and operated by Seay Broadcasting Company.

History/Programming
WHBK began broadcasting in 1954 as WMMH.

WHBK currently carries a Southern Gospel format fed from Salem Radio Networks Solid Gospel network.  The station also carries SRN Radio News, also from Salem, along with weather forecasts from Greenville, South Carolina NBC-affiliate WYFF.  Local programming consists of area farm reports, a Trading Post program, a Community Bulletin Board (featuring local events) and other programming.  Local sports from Madison High School and college sports from the North Carolina Tar Heels are also heard.

References

External links
 Solid Gospel WHBK Online

1954 establishments in North Carolina
Radio stations established in 1954
Southern Gospel radio stations in the United States
HBK